Su Guoxiong (born 26 May 1992) is a Chinese long-distance runner.

In 2012, he competed in the men's half marathon at the 2012 IAAF World Half Marathon Championships held in Kavarna, Bulgaria. He finished in 64th place.

In 2014, he finished in 8th place in the men's marathon at the 2014 Asian Games held in Incheon, South Korea.

References

External links 
 

Living people
1992 births
Place of birth missing (living people)
Chinese male long-distance runners
Chinese male marathon runners
Athletes (track and field) at the 2014 Asian Games
Asian Games competitors for China